Huaytará Province is the largest of seven provinces located in the Huancavelica Region of Peru. The capital city is Huaytará. The province has a population of 17,247 inhabitants as of 2017.

Boundaries
North: Castrovirreyna Province, Huancavelica Province, Angaraes Province
East: Ayacucho Region
South: Ica Region and Ayacucho Region
West: Ica Region

Geography 
Some of the highest mountains of the province are listed below:

Political division
The province is divided into sixteen districts, which are:

 Ayaví (Ayaví)
 Córdova (Córdova)
 Huayacundo Arma (Huayacundo Arma)
 Huaytará (Huaytará)
 Laramarca (Laramarca)
 Ocoyo (Ocoyo)
 Pilpichaca (Pilpichaca)
 Querco (Querco)
 Quito-Arma (Quito-Arma)
 San Antonio de Cusicancha (Cusicancha)
 San Francisco de Sangayaico (San Francisco de Sangayaico)
 San Isidro (San Juan de Huirpacancha)
 Santiago de Chocorvos (Santiago de Chocorvos)
 Santiago de Quirahuara (Santiago de Quirahuara)
 Santo Domingo de Capillas (Santo Domingo de Capillas)
 Tambo (Tambo)

Ethnic groups 
The province is inhabited by Indigenous citizens of Quechua descent. Spanish is the language which the majority of the population (73.93%) learnt to speak in childhood, 25.85% of the residents started speaking using the Quechua language (2007 Peru Census).

See also
 Ccotanca
 Ccuelluccasa
 Challwamayu
 Chuqlluqucha
 Inka Wasi
 Q'araqucha
 Runayuq
 Urququcha
 Wiraqucha Pirqa

Sources 

Provinces of the Huancavelica Region